Parotocinclus arandai is a species of catfish in the family Loricariidae. It is native to South America, where it occurs in tributaries of the Jucurucu River and the Buranhém River in Brazil. It is found in clear shallow waters with a depth of around 0.3 m (0.98 ft) and a substrate of sand or gravel. The species reaches 4.3 cm (1.7 inches) SL.

References 
 

Loricariidae
Otothyrinae
Fish described in 2009
Fauna of Brazil